Sunde Church is a parish church of the Church of Norway in the southern part of the large Stavanger Municipality in Rogaland county, Norway. It is located in the village of Sunde in the borough of Madla in the western part of the city of Stavanger. It is the church for the Sunde parish which is part of the Ytre Stavanger prosti (deanery) in the Diocese of Stavanger. The brick and concrete church was built in a fan-shaped design in 1984 using designs by the architect Reidar Vollan. The church seats about 650 people.

See also
List of churches in Rogaland

References

Churches in Stavanger
Brick churches in Norway
20th-century Church of Norway church buildings
Churches completed in 1984
1984 establishments in Norway